Jacob Crowninshield (March 31, 1770 –  April 15, 1808) was a U.S. Representative from Massachusetts and appointee to the position of U.S. Secretary of the Navy, which he never filled. His brother Benjamin Williams Crowninshield did successfully hold the post; the Crowninshield family in general was prominent in early American maritime affairs. His ancestor, Johann Casper Richter von Kronenscheldt, immigrated from Leipzig. (Ambiguous entry) He was the grandfather of Arent S. Crowninshield.

Biography
Jacob Crowninshield was born March 31, 1770, in Salem in the Province of Massachusetts Bay. As a young man, he went into partnership with three of his brothers commanding trade ships between the United States and India.

In 1796, Crowninshield married Sarah Gardner, daughter of John (a direct descendant of an old planter) and Sarah (Derby, daughter of Richard (1712–1783)). Their daughter Sarah later married the Salem merchant Richard Saltonstall Rogers.

Crowninshield was an unsuccessful candidate for election to Congress in 1798, to fill the vacancy caused by the resignation of Dwight Foster, but was elected to the Massachusetts State Senate in 1801.

In November 1802, he was elected as a Democratic-Republican to Congress and served in the 8th, 9th and 10th Congresses. During the 9th Congress, he was chairman of the United States House Committee on Commerce and Manufactures. He died of tuberculosis in Washington, D.C. on April 15, 1808, near the end of his third term. Crowninshield was 38 years old at the time of his death.

In 1805, Crowninshield was nominated to the position of U.S. Secretary of the Navy by President Thomas Jefferson, and was confirmed by the Senate, but he declined to take up the position, and continued to serve in Congress.

Crowninshield is buried in Harmony Grove Cemetery in his hometown of Salem.

See also
List of United States Congress members who died in office (1790–1899)
George Crowninshield Jr., brother

Footnotes

External links

 Jacob Crowninshield at Miller Center of Public Affairs

1770 births
1808 deaths
Crowninshield family
Massachusetts state senators
Politicians from Salem, Massachusetts
Democratic-Republican Party members of the United States House of Representatives from Massachusetts
People of colonial Massachusetts
Burials at Harmony Grove Cemetery
19th-century deaths from tuberculosis
Tuberculosis deaths in Washington, D.C.